Dani Stevenson (born September 3, 1980) is an American contemporary R&B singer-songwriter. She is best known for her background vocals on Nelly's single, "Hot in Herre" and her own singles, "Honk Your Horn" (featuring Missy Elliott) and "Yo, Yo, Yo" which was featured in the film XXX starring Vin Diesel.

Early life
At the age of 12, Dani Stevenson moved from her hometown Atlanta, Georgia, to Harlem, New York. Upon her arrival in Harlem, she had deep aspirations of pursuing a music career. She went on to perform the National Anthem at a junior high graduation and appeared in various talent contests. In 1998, she performed at the Greenwich Village open mic circuit.

Music career
By August 2001, Stevenson met up with producer Rhemario Webber through a mutual friend and the two teamed up to craft a 10-track demo. The result was a contract deal with Universal Records in February 2002. After signing to Universal, the label suggested Stevenson to contribute vocals to labelmate Nelly's 2002 single, "Hot in Herre"; Stevenson agreed and collaborated with Nelly and producer Pharrell Williams. Stevenson recalled, "Nelly was writing lyrics in his two-way; Pharrell [from the Neptunes] wanted the song to be sexy. He sang it the way he wanted me to sing it, and then I just put my own little stamp on it. It only took about 15 minutes."

Following the song's success, Universal Records gave her the go to prepare a debut album. Stevenson alongside Webber wrote 11 out of the 13 tracks and incorporated the 10-track demo to the debut. The debut album was tentatively titled Is There Another?! and was scheduled for a release in March 2003. The Missy Elliott–produced "Honk Your Horn" was released as the album's lead single on September 17, 2002. Although it was released to the general public that year, it did not begin to chart until October 2003, a year following its original release. On August 6, 2002, the soundtrack to XXX was released and featured Stevenson's song, "Yo, Yo, Yo". The song would be released on April 29, 2003, as the second single from Stevenson's debut. By 2004, Is There Another?! had passed its scheduled release date and its singles still failed to make a proper entry on the Billboard charts. As a result, Stevenson left Universal Records and her debut album was shelved.

In 2006, nearly two years after her departure with Universal, Stevenson contributed to Norman Hedman's Tropique's final studio album, Garden of Forbidden Fruit.

In 2010, Stevenson inked a new deal with Starrlet Entertainment, and released the single "Wishing Well" alongside its music video on September 6 of that same year. In 2011, Stevenson began working with Ruff Ryders rapper DMX. Stevenson contributed vocals to DMX and New Orleans rap group N.O.4's collaborative single, "Tell Ya Friends". By December 2011, Stevenson was featured in the single's music video. In 2012, Stevenson was featured on DMX's album, Undisputed, on the track "Sucka for Love".

Discography

Singles

As featured artist

Album guest appearances

Music videos

Concert tours

Headlining
2002: Organic Soul Night (sponsored by Coca-Cola and Ebony)

Joint tours
2002: Yardfest Tour (sponsored by Colgate Fresh Confidence and Vibe)
2003: ElleGirl (with 3LW and Eve)

Filmography

References

External links

Official YouTube channel
AllMusic Bio
ARTISTdirect Bio

1980 births
Living people
People from Harlem
Singers from New York City
African-American women singer-songwriters
American contemporary R&B singers
American hip hop singers
21st-century African-American women singers
Singer-songwriters from New York (state)